The Asian Football Confederation's 1989 AFC Women's Championship was held from 19 to 29 December 1989 in Hong Kong. The tournament was won by for the second consecutive time by China in the final against Chinese Taipei.

Group stage

Group A

Group B

Knock-out stage

Semi-final

Third place match

Final

Winner

Goalscorers

External links
 RSSSF.com

Women's Championship
AFC Women's Asian Cup tournaments
International association football competitions hosted by Hong Kong
Afc
AFC
AFC Women's Championship
AFC Women's Championship